Noor Naga is a Canadian-Egyptian writer, most noted for her 2022 novel If an Egyptian Cannot Speak English. 

Naga was born in Philadelphia and spent time living in Charleston, South Carolina, until at age seven, she and her family moved to Dubai. She received a Master of Arts in Creative Writing from the University of Toronto. Naga presently lives in Cairo.

Awards and honours
Naga received the Canada Graduate Scholarship-Master’s, as well as the Mary Coyne Rowell Jackman Graduate Scholarship and Avie Bennett Emerging Writers Scholarship from the University of Toronto.

CBC included Naga's Washes, Prays in their "Best Canadian Poetry of 2020" list. If an Egyptian Cannot Speak English received positive media responses, as well. TIME included it on their list of "100 Must-Read Books of 2022,” and BuzzFeed listed it as one of their "Best Books of 2022." Kirkus Reviews also included it on their "Best Fictional Voices of 2022" list.

Publications

 Washes, Prays (2020)
 If an Egyptian Cannot Speak English (2022)

References

21st-century Canadian novelists
21st-century Canadian poets
21st-century Canadian women writers
21st-century Egyptian poets
21st-century Egyptian women writers
Canadian women poets
Canadian women novelists
Egyptian women poets
Egyptian women novelists
Living people
Year of birth missing (living people)

External links 

 CBC Radio interview about Washes, Prays
 Official website

University of Toronto alumni